Sam Mercer is a producer of many films directed by M. Night Shyamalan such as The Sixth Sense, Unbreakable, and Signs, as well as other films like Van Helsing and Things We Lost in the Fire. His career started during the early 1980s as a location manager and later advanced to a producer and executive producer. He also produced  Shyamalan's films The Happening and The Last Airbender.

Filmography
Producer

Executive producer

References

External links
 

American film producers
Living people
Year of birth missing (living people)